Baankey Ki Crazy Baraat (Baankey's Crazy Wedding Procession) is a 2015 Bollywood comedy film directed by Aijaz Khan, starring Rajpal Yadav, Vijay Raaz, Sanjay Mishra, Tia Bajpai, Rakesh Bedi, Satyajeet Dubey and the director himself among others. Hazel Keech has a special appearance. It was produced by Anita Mani and released on 28 August 2015.

Plot summary 

This film follows the story of a 35-year-old bachelor Baankey (Rajpal Yadav), who is desperate to get married. He has a 'dosh' in his 'kundali' which has barred him from marriage. When he receives the proposal from Anjali (Tia Bajpai), he sets his heart to marry her. Unfortunately, it is found out that there is some issue with horoscope-matching. But, Baankey insists to marry her. So, his father Nandlal (Rakesh Bedi), uncle Kanhaiyalal (Sanjay Mishra) and goon Lallan (Vijay Raaz) press the priest to find a way. The priest offers the solution of a proxy wedding in which a proxy groom has to substitute Baankey at the wedding 'mandap' and go through all the wedding rituals. The family then sets out to find a proxy groom and end up hiring Rajesh (Satyajeet Dubey in double role). However, on the day of the wedding, Rajesh does not show up. The shrewd uncle of Baankey, Kanhaiya convinces the bus driver, Virat Sharma (Satyajeet Dubey) to be the proxy groom, who accepts the offer because of his father's debt. Later, Virat and Anjali fall in love. Virat also engineers some second-thoughts and keeps on hiking the amount of debt to be forgiven. Out of compulsion, the family agrees to his demands, and Virat ends up debt-free before the rituals are performed. Unaware of the truth, Anjali happily marries Virat. It is only after she reaches Baankey's place, she learns about the proxy wedding. Heartbroken after tricking Baankey, she calls Virat, who is then in the bus outside the house, remembering all the moments spent with her, realizing his immense love towards her. Upon receiving the call, Virat comes to rescue her and gets her out of that house. They are then chased by Lallan and his other goons, but the couple successfully elopes..

Cast 
 Rajpal Yadav as Baankey
 Sanjay Mishra as Kanhaiya
 Vijay Raaz as Lallan
 Rakesh Bedi as Nandlal
 Tia Bajpai as Anjali
 Satyajeet Dubey as Virat / Rajesh
 Anil Mange as Rajinder
 Aijaz Khan as Narayan
 Aashish Wadde as Mahesh
 Pankaj Jha as Relative of Lal Family
 Anusha Sampath as Pooja
 Hazel Keech in an item number
Ramdayal rajpurohit as avadh

Soundtrack 
The music for Baankey ki Crazy Baraat is composed by Vijayaa Shanker and Abhishek Nailwal

Track listing

Critical reception

Zee News gave the film 1.5 stars. It wrote, "Treated as a comedy, the film is packed with quirky characters with idiosyncratic behaviour, situational gags and witty dialogues. "Performances of most of the actors were applauded. With a moderate budget and decent production values, the film was said to be technically sound.
Kunal Gupta from Mumbai Mirror gave the film only 1 star and criticized it heavily.
Johnson Thomas from The Free Press Journal also seemed to criticize the film. He mentioned it as just plain miserable mayhem. He wrote: "It's quite a convoluted set-up with nothing meritorious about it. The clutch of seasoned performers ... have nothing much to do other than repeat familiar character tropes in order to stay visible."
Shaheen Parkar from Mid-Day gave 1.5 stars. She had mixed opinions about the film. She mentioned that it was pretty wholesome fare except for a forced item number. Even with seasoned actors of comic capers, it did not result in tongue-in-cheek humour as the plot meandered instead of concentrating on the funny lines. She wrote, "On the whole, the experience of watching Baankey Ki Crazy Baraat is like attending a lavish wedding feast, but ending up with indigestion."

References

External links
 

2015 films
2010s Hindi-language films
Indian comedy films
2015 comedy films
Hindi-language comedy films